Polly Craus August (February 17, 1923 – October 7, 2006) was an American fencer. She competed in the women's individual foil event at the 1952 Summer Olympics.

References

External links
 

1923 births
2006 deaths
American female foil fencers
Olympic fencers of the United States
Fencers at the 1952 Summer Olympics
20th-century American women
21st-century American women